Zvi Meir (Henry H.) Sophia (12 August 1935 – 21 December 2006) is a former Israeli politician who served as a member of the Knesset for Yisrael BaAliyah between 1996 and 1999.

Born in Brekov in Czechoslovakia (today in Slovakia), Weinberg emigrated to Canada and developed there his academic career. He held a PhD in French Literature, chaired academic seminars on Zionist thought and served as deputy chairman of the "Canadian Professors for Peace in the Middle East" organization.

Weinberg made aliyah to Israel in 1992 and joined public actions to encourage immigration of the Soviet Jewry to the State of Israel. He was a founding member of the political party "Yisrael BaAliyah" and was placed on its list of candidates for the 1996 Knesset elections. Weinberg served in the Knesset for a single term and was a member of the Foreign Affairs and Defense Committee, Constitution, Law and Justice Committee, Economic Affairs Committee and the Education and Culture Committee.

External links

 "Zeidy's prayer", Aish HaTorah website

1935 births
2006 deaths
Polish emigrants to Canada
Israeli Jews
Canadian people of Polish-Jewish descent
Canadian people of Slovak-Jewish descent
Canadian emigrants to Israel
Jewish Canadian politicians
Yisrael BaAliyah politicians
Members of the 14th Knesset (1996–1999)